is a Japanese manga series written and illustrated by Tsukasa Hojo. The series was adapted into an anime series produced by Sunrise and broadcast by Yomiuri Television.

City Hunter '91 was broadcast between April 28 and October 10, 1991. The opening theme was "Downtown Game" by Gwinko and the closing theme was "Smile & Smile" by Aura.

The series was released on 6 VHS between February and July 1992.  A Thirty-Two disc DVD boxset City Hunter Complete published by Aniplex was released in Japan on August 31, 2005. The set contained all four series, the TV specials and animated movies as well as an art book and figures of Ryo and Kaori. The City Hunter '91 discs from this set were released individually on August 27, 2008.

City Hunter '91 was released in North America by ADV Films on December 16, 2003.

Episode list

References

91